Tälesbahn is a standard gauge railway in Baden-Württemberg.

History 
The branch line from Geislingen an der Steige to Wiesensteig was inaugurated on 21 October 1903. In the early years the Tälesbahn served primarily for passenger transport and the transport of goods for the holdings situated in the region. The section from Geislingen to Stauferstollen was electrified since 12 December 1937 due to the heavy ore trains.

Decommissioning

The section from Deggingen to Wiesensteig was shut down in 1968 for passengers and freight. Until Deggingen passenger traffic was maintained until 1 June 1980, the freight transport to 29 September 1981.
To mark the 150th anniversary of the Geislinger Steige in 2000, tours with the local train, run by the railway friends of Ulm-Amstetten, from Geislingen station to Geislingen-Altenstadt were offered. In December of the same year the railway traffic was finally stopped, and the track was shut down completely.

Relicts
In Bad Überkingen the route is overbuilt, but a bicycle track is located on the route to Wiesensteig.

Literature 
 
 Rudolf P. Pavel: Geislinger Steige und Täleskätter – württembergische Eisenbahngeschichte, Pavel, Neckargerach [ca. 1982]

Standard gauge railways in Germany
Railway lines in Baden-Württemberg
Buildings and structures in Göppingen (district)